The Gull Wing Group International (GWG) is a 501(c)(7) Nonprofit organization of 1954 to 1963 Mercedes-Benz 300 SL enthusiasts worldwide formed in 1961 to maintain and give members the opportunity to become acquainted with the mechanics and handling of the 300SL.

The GWG organizes car-related events, including driving tours, an annual convention with technical sessions and driver's education and social events.

The organization has an international membership of about 600 members from 25 countries. As of 2019, Southern California is the largest region with 150 active members. Membership is open to anyone.

History

The GWG started with eighteen Mercedes 300SL enthusiasts on August 1961 by Ernie Spitzer, an entrepreneur who owned a commercial printing business. The first meeting was held in Palo Alto, California at Ricky's Studio Inn and Hotel.

By the end of 1961, the club had expanded to 38 dues paying members. A year later, the members and their cars were photographed at the Presidio with the Golden Gate Bridge in the background for Road & Track magazine and the 1963 issue of the Mercedes Benz magazine In Aller Welt and again in 1979. By the end of 1962, the organization had grown to just over 50, with some now coming from the rest of the United States and Canada. Many members were from Southern California and Oregon.

By fall of 1963, there were by-laws, and members paid dues of $10.00.  By 1965, the GWG had formed a Southern California Chapter, and the first meeting took place at the home of Stan Kauffman on August 11, 1965.  Kauffman was President,  James Mangham was VP, and Tom Burniston was Secretary.  Nineteen members of the Northern and Southern California Chapters met in Santa Barbara to plan for the first annual get-together, which was held in Reno, Nevada in May 1969.  Membership had risen to nearly 200, and almost half attended the event when Chad Hunt became president.

The organization began attracting members from all over the country, and Hunt suggested a formal Business Office be created. In 1971, membership had grown to 387. The GWG accepted roadster owners in 1971 though they could not vote. In 1972 Roadster owners were able to vote.

In 2020, the GWG board voted on formally inviting Mercedes-Benz SLS AMG owners to become members. Inviting the SLS owners into the GWG exposes the 300 SL model to younger car enthusiasts.  The SLS AMG is the spiritual successor to the 300 SL. The SLS AMG was designed to be a modern Gull Wing revival, and Mercedes produced 11473 cars from 2010 to 2015. Many GWG members who own a 300 SL also own an SLS. SLSs can be shown and judged at conventions.

Events

The first official event was a series of three technical sessions by a representative of the Robert Bosch Corporation covering the car's fuel injection system. GWG has held driving events every year other than 2020.

On 11 June 2011, the GWG gathered at Fort Point at the south end of the Golden Gate Bridge to celebrate the 50th anniversary of the club.

President John Willott and fellow members Craig Mcloughlin and Tom Thornhill organized a tour of Arizona driving 1000 miles in 2018. Rykodisc founder, Don Rose participated.

In 2012,  member, Garry Boyce, organized an international rally tour in New Zealand.

Bob Sirna, a previous president of the organization, set a new Bonneville Speedway F/GT speed record in 2016 in a 300 SL, establishing a new mark for 3L Sports cars of 190.759 mph. Sirna's project was executed with Dean Johnson's assistance. Dean Johnson is an ex-board member of the GWG and serves on the Tech Committee.

Amir Almagor, a board member of the group, organized the 2015 and 2018 Holyland1000 tours in Israel. Eight Roadsters and two Gullwings participated in March 2018 in a 1000-mile tour of 77 pre-1965 cars around Israel.

The organization has an international membership of approximately 600 members from 25 countries. As of 2019, Southern California is the largest region with 150 active members. Membership is open to anyone.  Each fall, an annual convention is held in different locations throughout the United States and Canada. The 2021 annual Convention in The Broadmoor in Colorado Springs, Colorado for five days celebrated the 60th Anniversary of the Gull Wing Group. One hundred and seventeen members came to the Convention, including 15 first-time attendees.

The GWG members attend events around the country every year, including the Copperstate 1000 and the Colorado Grand.

Publications

Spitzer typed up a (nearly) monthly bulletin, the precursor to the Group's 300StarLetter. The first Bulletin was a simple four-page mimeographed edition produced in January 1962. The cover topic for the June 1962 issue was the First Anniversary Dinner, which was coming up later that month at the San Francisco Airport Hilton. The tab of $5.00 per person for the evening included a cocktail hour and dinner. The award-winning 300StarLetter is published ten times a year. 

The Group's roster has been a valuable vehicle ownership source and maintains an active directory that shows the provenance of cars sold at auction.

Benefits
The GWG has a parts store open to members, technical assistance from its technical committee, an annual convention and rally held in different parts of the USA.

The 300SL Classic was initiated by GWG members Tom Thornhill, John Willott, and Craig McLaughlin and continues to be supported by the GWG.

The GWG supports charities such as the Make a Wish Foundation and McPherson College.

Conventions

As of 2022, there have been 53 Conventions.  Past conventions have been held in  Lake Geneva, Wisconsin, Pasadena, California, Santa Fe, New Mexico; Jackson Hole, Wyoming; Saratoga Springs, New York; Dearborn, Michigan; Las Vegas, Nevada; Newport, Rhode Island; Nashville, Tennessee; Victoria. British Columbia; Sun Valley, IDaho; Flagstaff, Arizona; Palm Springs, California; Montvale, New Jersey; New Orleans, Louisiana; Homestead, Virginia, Colorado Springs, Colorado, Greenbrier County, West Virginia and many other locations.

2022 convention

One hundred five attendees, along with ten Gullwings and twelve Roadsters participated in Greenbrier, WV. As well as eight SLSs (5 coupes and three roadsters), a 280 SL, a 300D Adenauer, two “Ostermeier” GWs, and one hand-built tribute GW". The 2022 convention had enough SLSs at the show to give awards for the first time. Hagerty presented on classic car insurance and others gave a review of SLS cars, options, and current market trends. The Fédération Internationale des Véhicules Anciens (FIVA) inspected twelve cars for the first time for the GWG.

References

External links
 Gull Wing Group International web site

Motor clubs
Automobile associations in the United States
Clubs and societies in the United States